Autosite can mean:
the independent twin of a pair of conjoined twins where the other twin is a parasitic twin
a website about cars